Kaathirunna Nimisham is a 1978 Indian Malayalam-language film, directed by Baby. The film stars Kamal Haasan, Vidhubala, Jayan, Jayabharathi and M. G. Soman. The film has musical score by M. K. Arjunan.

Cast 
Kamal Haasan as Raju
Vidhubala as Sumathi
Jayan as Venu
Jayabharathi as Ramani/Devi
Sukumaran as Raghu
M. G. Soman as Gopi
Kuthiravattom Pappu as Harischandran Nair
Jagathy Sreekumar as V. N. Kumaran
Kunchan as Pottan
Mallika Sukumaran as Savithri
Nellikode Bhaskaran as Venu's father
Nilambur Balan as Ashan
Nilambur Ayisha as Raju's mother
K. P. A. C. Lalitha as Ambujam

Production 
Kaathirunna Nimisham film produced under production banner Dhanya Enterprises. This film was shot in black-and-white. It was given an "U" (Unrestricted) certificate by the Central Board of Film Certification.

Soundtrack 
The music was composed by M. K. Arjunan and the lyrics were written by Sreekumaran Thampi.

References

External links

view the film 
 kathirunna nimisham Malayalam movie.

1970s Malayalam-language films
1978 films
Indian black-and-white films
Indian romantic drama films
Films directed by Baby (director)